Ilkin or İlkin is an Azerbaijani and Turkish given name and surname. Notable people with the name or surname include:

People

Given name
Ilkin Hajiyev (born 1983), Azerbaijani futsal player
Ilkin Shahbazov (born 1986), Azerbaijani taekwondo player
Ilkin Qirtimov (born 1990), Azerbaijani footballer
Ilkin Aydın (born 2000), Turkish volleyball player

Surname
 Baki İlkin, Turkish diplomat
 Tunch Ilkin, Turkish sports broadcaster

Turkish-language surnames